The Greenwich Titans are an English basketball club, based in the London Borough of Greenwich.

History
The Titans were formed in 2012 by the Greenwich Sports Academy, on the back of the London 2012 Olympics, to provide opportunities for the residents of Greenwich to play basketball and represent the area. The Titans entered the English Basketball League in the same year, and have steadily risen through the lower divisions of the league. As of the 2019-20 season, the Titans play in Division 2 South, the third tier of the British basketball system. The club also run 4 youth teams in the respective junior national leagues.

Honours
National League Men's Division 3 South (1) : 2017–18
National League Men's Development League South East (1): 2015–16

Teams

Senior Men - National League Division 2 South
U-18 Men - National League U-18 Premier South
U-16 Boys - National League U-16 Conference South

U-16 Girls - National League U-16 Conference South
U-14 Boys - National League U-14 Conference South

Home Venue
The Titans are based at the Thomas Tallis School in Kidbrooke, Greenwich and Greenwich University.

Notable former players
Worcester Wolves and BBL forward Jordan Williams has played for the Titans.

Season-by-season records

References

Basketball teams in England
Sports teams in London
Basketball teams established in 2012